Hyoscyameae is an Old World tribe of the subfamily Solanoideae of the flowering plant family Solanaceae. It comprises eight genera: Anisodus, Archihyoscyamus, Atropa, Atropanthe, Hyoscyamus, Physochlaina, Przewalskia and Scopolia. The genera Archihyoscyamus, Atropanthe and Przewalskia are monotypic, the first being endemic to Turkey and Iran, the second to China and the third to Tibet.

All eight genera of the tribe are poisonous and have a long tradition of use as medicinal plants, being rich in tropane alkaloids with anticholinergic properties. Furthermore, the genera Atropa, Hyoscyamus, Scopolia and Physochlaina have furnished entheogens - the first three in the historical context of European witchcraft and, more specifically, of the flying ointments employed in such practices, while the similar chemistry of the remaining genera points to the potential for entheogenic use. Six of the genera have dry, pyxidial fruits i.e. capsules dehiscing by an operculum and thus resembling a pot with a lid. The fruit of the remaining genus Atropa is a glossy, juicy berry, making Atropa species especially dangerous poisonous plants, since - unlike other Hyoscyameae - their attractive fruits may easily be mistaken for edible berries, particularly by children - as has frequently occurred in the case of Atropa belladonna, the infamous Deadly Nightshade.

A ninth genus referable to Hyoscyameae remains unresolved : the poorly-known, monotypic genus Pauia contains the single species Pauia belladonna Deb and Dutta native to Assam and Arunachal Pradesh. The late Professor Armando Theodoro Hunziker, one of the foremost authorities on the Solanaceae, was of the opinion that Pauia should be subsumed in Atropa. The plant resembles the Indian Atropa acuminata, but differs from it most markedly in bearing a berry that, unlike those of other Atropa species, is not globose but oblong in shape, somewhat resembling that edible Solanaceous fruit the Goji.

Gallery

References

 
Solanoideae
Deliriants
Asterid tribes